The Taj Mahal, an iconic structure in India, has inspired numerous replicas and derivatives. "The Taj", informally, is now a major tourist attraction in Agra, Uttar Pradesh, and has been regarded as one of the New Seven Wonders of the World.  Since  1632, when Mughal emperor Shah Jahan began building the Taj to house the tomb of his favorite wife, Mumtaz Mahal, it has inspired many notable replicas, and major derivative structures include a 1678-started project of the emperor's grandson.  Some are intended to be scale models or otherwise to be more or less faithful copies, and others are designed with mild or extreme interpretations of the Taj's architecture adapted to serve other purposes.

These include:

Asia

Bangladesh

Lalbagh Fort, an incomplete 17th-century Mughal red sandstone monument inspired by the Taj Mahal. It was built by Shah Jahan's son, Aurangzeb who later built another Taj replica in Maharashtra, India - Bibi ka Maqbara.
Taj Masjid, a Taj inspired mosque near Dhaka.

India
 

India, the homeland of the original Taj, has several replicas spread across the nation:
Bibi Ka Maqbara in  Aurangabad, Maharashtra; also called as the 'Taj of the Deccan' was built by Shah Jahan's own son,   Aurangzeb as an attempt to outdo the original Taj.
Shahzadi Ka Maqbara, in Chota Imambara, Lucknow, Uttar Pradesh
Taj of Bangalore, a 40 feet tall and 70 feet by 70 feet wide replica of Taj Mahal in Bannerghatta Road, Bengaluru was built by Malaysian architect, Sekar in September 2015.
 A monument of Love called Maqbara Yadgare Mohabbat Tajammuli Begum, also known as Mini Taj Mahal in Bulandshahr district, Uttar Pradesh was built by a poor pensioner Faizul Hasan Quadri, 77, in memory of his wife Late Tajammuli Begum in his nondescript village in Northern India.
Vardhman Fantasyland in Mumbai, Maharashtra has a miniature replica of the Taj Mahal.

China
A replica of the Taj Mahal stands in the Window of the World theme park located in the western part of the city of Shenzhen.

Indonesia

Al-Hakim Mosque in Padang, West Sumatra. 
Ramlie Musofa Mosque in Jakarta.

Kuwait

The Al-Siddiqa Fatima Al-Zahra Mosque is a small mosque and a replica of the Taj Mahal. It is located in the Dahiya Abdullah Mubarak community near the Kuwait International Airport.

Malaysia
Mini Taj Mahal in Legoland Malaysia Resort in Nusajaya, Johor

United Arab Emirates
 A small replica of the Taj Mahal is used as an Indian exhibit at the Global Village in Dubai, UAE.
Taj Arabia is a yet to be built 20-storey 350-room super luxury hotel in Dubai, United Arab Emirates which is planned to be an accurately scaled replica of the Taj Mahal made using glass. The glass hotel and its wedding hall are complemented with a suite of other Indian-themed facilities.
 A replica of the Taj Mahal is planned at the Falcon City of Wonders development in Dubai. 
 Taj Mahal at Legoland Dubai.

The Americas

North America

Canada
 Thomas Foster Memorial Temple is a memorial to the Canadian Politician, Thomas Foster in Uxbridge, Ontario inspired by the Taj Mahal.

United States
 

Trump Taj Mahal was a casino located at 1000 Boardwalk in Atlantic City, New Jersey and modelled after the Taj Mahal. It has been remodeled into the Hard Rock Hotel & Casino Atlantic City
Tripoli Shrine Temple in the Concordia neighborhood of Milwaukee, Wisconsin 
 Taj Mahal Houseboat, Sausalito, California is a Taj Mahal inspired houseboat in California.

South America

Brazil
Sesc Mineiro Grussaí, in São João da Barra, Rio de Janeiro

Colombia
Jaime Duque Park, in Tocancipá, a municipality of the Metropolitan Area of Bogotá. The park contains a replica of the Taj Mahal, as well as replicas of the Seven Wonders of the Ancient World.

References

Taj Mahal
Lists of replicas